Aluma is a street newspaper sold by the homeless in Malmö, Lund and Helsingborg, Sweden. It was established in 2001.

In 2006, it was awarded the grand prize of Publicistklubben (Swedish Publicists' Association) together with its sister papers Situation Sthlm and Faktum.

References

External links 

Street newspapers
Daily newspapers published in Sweden
Mass media in Malmö
Mass media in Lund
Publications established in 2001
2001 establishments in Sweden